Tom Parker (born August 19, 1951) is an American lawyer and judge. He is the chief justice of the Alabama Supreme Court winning election in November 2018.  He previously served as an associate justice on the court having been elected to that position in 2004 and re-elected in 2010.

Education
Parker graduated from Dartmouth College and Vanderbilt University Law School. He studied at the Law School, University of São Paulo in Brazil as a Rotary International fellow.

Career
In 1989, Parker became the founding executive director of the Alabama Family Alliance (later renamed the Alabama Policy Institute), a conservative think tank. At other points in his career, Parker was an Alabama assistant attorney general, deputy administrative director of Alabama courts; general counsel for Alabama trial courts; and director of the Alabama Judicial College.

Parker defeated Robert H. Smith to become an associate justice on the Alabama Supreme Court in 2004 and was sworn in on January 14, 2005.

He unsuccessfully ran for chief justice in 2006.

He was re-elected in 2010.

Parker successfully sought a third term as associate justice in 2016.

On June 5, 2018, Parker won the Republican nomination for Chief Justice over incumbent Chief Justice Lyn Stuart, although seven current and former Alabama Supreme Court justices publicly supported Stuart over Parker in the primary, two of whom - despite being republicans - would contribute to Parker's Democratic opponent in the general election. Parker went on to defeat the Democratic nominee, Circuit Judge Bob Vance, in the general election on November 6, 2018. The campaign was marked by negative television advertising in which Parker's campaign ran ads accusing Vance (who was supported by a moderate coalition) of being backed by "leftist billionaires"  and in which Vance's campaign ran ads saying that Parker was "another Roy Moore" who would  bring more "chaos and controversy" to Alabama. It was also notable for the significant support Parker received from the trial lawyers via the Progress for Justice PAC.

He was sworn in as Chief Justice of Alabama on January 11, 2019.

Parker currently sits on the Board of Jurists at the Blackstone and Burke Center for Law and Liberty, at Faulkner University. On Indigenous Peoples' Day in 2022 Parker sent a letter of apology to the Echota Cherokee Tribe on behalf of the past actions against their people during the times of removal.

Controversies

Alleged support of white supremacist groups 
As a candidate in 2004, he was criticized by the Southern Poverty Law Center for distributing confederate flags at a funeral of a confederate widow. Parker was photographed at the funeral standing between Leonard Wilson, a board member of the Council of Conservative Citizens, and Mike Whorton, a leader with the League of the South. He denied being a member of either group and said he did not consider his actions in either event inappropriate for a judicial candidate. Parker was also criticized for attending a party in Selma commemorating the birthday of Confederate Gen. Nathan Bedford Forrest, founder of the Ku Klux Klan. The party was hosted at "Fort Dixie" by Pat and Butch Godwin, operator of Friends of Forrest Inc. and also involved with the League of the South.

Editorial criticizing fellow justices 
In 2006, Parker wrote an op-ed, published in The Birmingham News, in which he criticized his colleagues on the state supreme court for a ruling the previous year in which the court reversed a death sentence for a 17-year-old convicted of murder, following the U.S. Supreme Court's decision in Roper v. Simmons. In the op-ed, Parker criticized the Roper decision as "blatant judicial tyranny" and asserted that "State supreme courts may decline to follow bad U.S. Supreme Court precedents because those decisions bind only the parties to the particular case." The claim was criticized by legal experts (as well as Alabama Chief Justice Drayton Nabers Jr., whom Parker was then running against) because it contravenes the accepted principle of American jurisprudence that the U.S. Supreme Court has ultimate authority on matters of federal law. Retired U.S. Supreme Court Justice Sandra Day O'Connor criticized Parker's op-ed in a Wall Street Journal commentary, writing that it was an inappropriate attack on fellow judges and was at odds with the Constitution's Supremacy Clause.

Criticized for low productivity as an associate justice 
Justice Tom Woodall, then running for his second term as an associate supreme court justice, criticized Parker as a candidate for chief justice in 2006. Woodhall characterized Parker's views as extreme, called Parker's op-ed criticizing his colleagues "cowardly and deceitful" and said that Parker "doesn't handle his cases; he just let's them pile up." Parker had the lowest productivity compared to the state's other new justices, writing only one opinion in his first fifteen months compared to 38 by Mike Bolin and 28 by Patricia Smith. Parker attributed slowness to the fact that he had no experience as a judge and because he had to hire new staff members.

Positions 
A longtime ally and former aide of Roy Moore, whose candidacy for United States Senate was derailed following multiple allegations of romantically pursuing teenagers while an adult, he is known for his conservative views. He strongly opposes Roe v. Wade (calling it a "constitutional aberration") and has written a number of anti-abortion judicial opinions. Parker opposes same-sex marriage and has criticized the U.S. Supreme Court decision in Obergefell v. Hodges.

Notable Cases

Personal life
Parker lives in Montgomery County and is married.

References

1951 births
Living people
20th-century American lawyers
21st-century American judges
Alabama Republicans
Chief Justices of the Supreme Court of Alabama
Dartmouth College alumni missing graduation year
Justices of the Supreme Court of Alabama
Lawyers from Montgomery, Alabama
Politicians from Montgomery, Alabama
Vanderbilt University Law School alumni